Duvortuxizumab (INN) is a chimeric/humanized monoclonal antibody designed for the treatment of B-cell malignancies.

This drug was developed by Janssen Global Services.

References 

Monoclonal antibodies